Albanian Supercup 1998 was the sixth edition of the Albanian Supercup since its establishment in 1989. The match was contested between the Albanian Cup 1998 winners KS Apolonia and the 1997–98 Albanian Superliga champions KS Vllaznia.

KS Vllaznia won 5-4 by penalties, as regular and extra time result ended 1-1.

Match details

See also
 1997–98 Albanian Superliga
 1997–98 Albanian Cup

References

RSSSF.com

1998
Supercup
Albanian Supercup, 1998
Albanian Supercup, 1998